The Journal of Medical Toxicology is a peer-reviewed medical journal on medical toxicology and the official journal of the American College of Medical Toxicology. It publishes original articles, illustrative cases, review articles, and other special features that are related to the clinical diagnosis and management of patients with exposure to various poisons. It was established in 2005 and published by the University of Pennsylvania Press. Since 2010 it is published by Springer Science+Business Media. The editor-in-chief is Mark Mycyk, MD.

Abstracting and indexing 
The journal is indexed or abstracted in:

External links
 

Toxicology journals
Springer Science+Business Media academic journals
English-language journals
Publications established in 2005